The Orenco IL-1 was an American two-seat liaison biplane built for the United States Army by the Ordnance Engineering Corporation (Orenco). The Model E-2 was a conventional biplane powered by a  Liberty 12 engine and designated IL-1 (Infantry Liaison) by the Army. First flown in 1919, two aircraft were built and evaluated by the Army at McCook Field as P-147 and P-168, but the type did not enter production.

Specifications

References

Notes

Bibliography

 

1910s United States military utility aircraft
IL-1
Single-engined tractor aircraft
Biplanes
Aircraft first flown in 1919